USS Pauline (SP-658) was a United States Navy patrol vessel in commission from 1917 to 1919.

Pauline was built as a civilian motorboat of the same name by the Everett Shaw Company at Cutler, Maine. On 28 June 1917, the U.S. Navy acquired her from her owner, the Maine Fish Patrol, for use as a section patrol boat during World War I. She was commissioned as USS Pauline (SP-658) on 2 July 1917.

Based at Boston, Massachusetts, Pauline served on patrol duties for the rest of World War I.

Pauline was returned to the Maine Fish Patrol on 28 January 1919.

References

SP-658 Pauline at Department of the Navy Naval History and Heritage Command Online Library of Selected Images: U.S. Navy Ships -- Listed by Hull Number "SP" #s and "ID" #s -- World War I Era Patrol Vessels and other Acquired Ships and Craft numbered from SP-600 through SP-699
NavSource Online: Section Patrol Craft Photo Archive Pauline (SP 658)

Patrol vessels of the United States Navy
World War I patrol vessels of the United States
Ships built in Maine
1917 ships